Alcatel (formerly Alcatel Mobile Phones and Alcatel OneTouch) (previously ALCATEL) is a French brand of mobile handsets owned by Finnish consumer electronics company Nokia and used under license by Chinese electronics company TCL Technology. The Alcatel brand was licensed in 2005 by former French electronics and telecommunications company Alcatel-Lucent to TCL for mobile phones and devices, and the current license expires at the end of 2024. Nokia acquired the assets of Alcatel-Lucent in 2016 and thus also inherited the licensing agreements for the Alcatel brand.

History 

Alcatel Mobile Phones was established on 24 April 2004 as a joint venture between Alcatel-Lucent (45%) and TCL Corporation (55%). Alcatel originally started making mobile phones in late 1996.

In 2005, the joint venture was dissolved and TCL acquired Alcatel-Lucent's 45 percent share, and Alcatel Mobile Phones became a wholly owned subsidiary group of TCL. The brand name was licensed to TCL.

In 2010, Alcatel One Touch became the corporate brand. In February 2016, it was changed back to simply Alcatel and a new logo was introduced.

Company structure 
TCL Mobile Limited (former name: T&A Mobile Phones Limited) is a member of TCL Communication listed on Hong Kong Stock Exchange (HKSE: 2618) which was established in August 2004 by TCL Communication and Alcatel. TCL Mobile Limited manages three business units: Alcatel, TCL Mobile Phones and Brand Design Lab. TCL Communication was also the developer of BlackBerry devices from 2016 to 2020 when its contract with BlackBerry expired.

Awards
In 2012, Alcatel won an International Forum Design iF design award for its One Touch 818 and the Onetouch 355 Play models.

Models
The first Alcatel phone was Alcatel OT Easy HF, released in 1998. Its battery standby time was up to 140 hours.

2014: Alcatel OneTouch Pop 7 was released.

2015: Alcatel OneTouch Pop Fit was released. The Pop Fit could be strapped to a wrist.

2016: Saw several releases: Alcatel Idol 4s, Pop 4, Pop 4+, Pop 4s, and Pop 7 LTE.

2017: During that year's Mobile World Congress (MWC) in Barcelona, TCL launched Alcatel A5 LED, purportedly the first Android smartphone with an "interactive LED-covered phone". On 10 November, the company launched the Alcatel A5 LED and Alcatel A7 in India.

2018: As demand grows for tablets that are compatible with keyboards and family use, TCL Communication is providing a tablet that can pull double duty with Alcatel 3T 8".

2019: TCL Communication is introducing its latest Alcatel mobile devices, including the Alcatel 3, Alcatel 3L and Alcatel 1S smartphones, as well as the Alcatel 3T 10 at Mobile World Congress 2019.

2020: TCL Communication Showcases Alcatel Mobile Product Portfolio With Fresh Design and Imaging Performance Milestones at CES 2020

2021: At MWC 2021 TCL is teasing an affordable 5G phone with its own brand, but the Alcatel brand is still around. The company introduced two entry-level Android Go 11 models 1L Pro and Alcatel 1 (2021) released at the end of year.

Gallery

Early devices

2005–present

References

External links
  
 Press release about TCL-Alcatel Joint Venture
 TCL-Communication-Corporate-Fact-Sheet
 TCL Communication Technology Holdings Limited (TCL) site 

 
Alcatel-Lucent
Consumer electronics brands
Joint ventures
Mobile phone manufacturers
Electronics companies of China
Chinese brands
Finnish brands
Mobile phone companies of Finland
Nokia assets